Ensign Pulver is a 1964 American Technicolor film in Panavision and a sequel to the 1955 film Mister Roberts. The film stars Robert Walker Jr., Burl Ives, Walter Matthau and Tommy Sands and features Millie Perkins, Larry Hagman, Kay Medford, Peter Marshall, Jack Nicholson, Richard Gautier, George Lindsey, James Farentino and James Coco.

The film was directed and co-written by Joshua Logan, who had directed and co-written the 1948 Mister Roberts stage play on Broadway, and also shot scenes for the 1955 film after director John Ford fell ill.

The story concerns the U.S.S. Reluctant, a cargo ship in the waning days of World War II, which is at anchor beside a tropical island.  The ship's captain is as much of a "Captain Bligh" as ever. Several of the film's events — such as attacking the Captain while he is watching a film, and one of the sailors trying to obtain compassionate leave to deal with a dying child — are taken from Thomas Heggen's original 1946 novel Mister Roberts. The characters of Pulver, Doc and several crewmen return from the first film, but played by different actors.

Plot 
U.S. Navy Ensign Frank Pulver (Robert Walker Jr.) feels unappreciated, as usual. Even when he personally aims a sharp object into the hindquarters of the hated Captain Morton (Burl Ives), the happy crew cannot imagine that the all-talk, no-action Pulver could be behind it. A poll to guess at the identity of the "ass-sassin" results in votes for almost everyone except Pulver, which he bitterly resents.

Shipmates like Billings (Larry Hagman), Insigna (James Farentino), Skouras (James Coco) and Dolan (Jack Nicholson) do not take Pulver seriously while despising the captain, who refuses to grant leave to a seaman named Bruno (Tommy Sands) to attend his daughter's funeral back home. Doc (Walter Matthau) is the only one aboard who believes in Pulver's potential at all.

At sea for months at a time, Pulver is unable to indulge his greatest interest, women, until a company of nurses land on a nearby atoll. The head nurse (Kay Medford) is pleased to meet him when Pulver introduces himself as a doctor serving on a destroyer, but young nurse Scotty (Millie Perkins) suspects the truth and a smitten Pulver confesses it to her, that he's no doctor and nothing more than a junior officer on "the worst ship in the Navy."

Bruno becomes so deranged, he attempts to kill the captain. Pulver reluctantly intervenes, but the captain falls overboard, and is about to drown until Pulver lowers a life raft and dives in to save him. Separated from their ship, with the crew unaware for hours that they are missing, Pulver and Morton bicker aboard the raft. The ensign takes notes while the delusional captain reveals dark secrets about his past.

In need of emergency surgery, Morton ends up owing his life yet again to Pulver, who follows Doc's instructions over a radio and removes the captain's appendix. Back aboard ship, Morton's natural tendencies resurface and he tries to return to his martinet ways. Although Pulver has the goods on him now he shows genuine compassion for the captain and convinces him to leave the ship for his own well-being. Morton takes his advice and departs, turning over command to the popular LaSeur (Gerald S. O'Loughlin).

Cast

 Robert Walker Jr. as Ensign Frank Pulver
 Burl Ives as Captain Morton
 Walter Matthau as Doc
 Tommy Sands as John X. Bruno
 Millie Perkins as Nurse Scotty
 Kay Medford as Head Nurse
 Larry Hagman as Billings
 Peter Marshall as Carney
 Joseph Marr as Yeoman Dowdy
 Gerald S. O'Loughlin as LaSueur
 Diana Sands as Mila
 Robert Matek as Captain Donald "Stretch" Zimmer
 Jack Nicholson as Dolan
 Al Freeman Jr. as Taru
 Richard Gautier as Stefanowski
 George Lindsey as Lindstrom
 Sal Papa as Gabrowski
 James Farentino as Insigna
 James Coco as Skouras
 Don Dorrell as Payne

Cast notes
 Gavin MacLeod has a bit part as a crewman

Production
Ensign Pulver began production under the working title "Mr. Pulver and the Captain".  Location scenes for the film were shot in Mexico City and Acapulco, Mexico.

Actor Jack Nicholson took it upon himself to assist director Josh Logan with casting, becoming an informal "assistant producer." Logan, who hoped that the film would repeat the success of Mister Roberts, recognized that it had fallen short of that mark, writing in his autobiography:

We thought we had everyone in the picture that anyone could ask for ... But we had left out the most important thing: the catalytic agent, Mister Roberts. And without him, the story falls into shreds. No one really cares about the others enough to create suspense as to the outcome.

In the original film, Jack Lemmon had won an Academy Award for Best Supporting Actor for his portrayal of Ensign Pulver, James Cagney had played the Captain, William Powell was Doc, and Henry Fonda portrayed Mister Roberts.

Paperback novelization
Concurrent with the release of the film, Dell Publishing issued a paperback novelization of the film by W. H. (William Henry) Manville, writing under the pseudonym he used for tie-in work, "Henry Williams."

Comic book adaption
 Dell Movie Classic: Ensign Pulver (August–October 1964)

See also
 List of American films of 1964

References
Notes

External links
 
 
 
 
 

1964 films
1960s war comedy-drama films
American sequel films
American war comedy-drama films
Films scored by George Duning
Films adapted into comics
Films based on American novels
Films directed by Joshua Logan
Military humor in film
Pacific War films
Films about the United States Navy in World War II
Warner Bros. films
American World War II films
1960s English-language films
1960s American films